John MacLaren Erskine VC (13 January 1894 – 14 April 1917) was a Scottish recipient of the Victoria Cross, the highest and most prestigious award for gallantry in the face of the enemy that can be awarded to British and Commonwealth forces.

Erskine was born in 1894 to William and Elizabeth Erskine. He was 22 years old, and a serjeant in the 5th Battalion, The Cameronians (Scottish Rifles), British Army during the First World War, when he was awarded the Victoria Cross for his actions on 22 June 1916 at Givenchy, France.

Citation

He was killed in action at Arras, France, on 14 April 1917 and is commemorated on the Arras Memorial.

The Medal
His Victoria Cross is displayed at the Cameronians Regimental Museum, in Hamilton Low Parks Museum, Hamilton, Lanarkshire, Scotland.

References

Monuments to Courage (David Harvey, 1999)
The Register of the Victoria Cross (This England, 1997)
Scotland's Forgotten Valour (Graham Ross, 1995)

External links
 

1894 births
1917 deaths
People from Dunfermline
British military personnel killed in World War I
British World War I recipients of the Victoria Cross
Cameronians soldiers
British Army personnel of World War I
British Army recipients of the Victoria Cross
Military personnel from Fife